Angus William Eden Holden, 3rd Baron Holden and 4th Baronet Holden (1 August 1898 – 6 July 1951), was a British Liberal then Labour politician.

Holden was the son of Ernest Illingworth Holden, 2nd Baron Holden, and his first wife Ethel (née Cookson), and succeeded to the barony on the death of his father in 1937.

He stood as the Liberal candidate for Tottenham North at the 1929 general election.

He was a Speaker and Deputy Chairman in the House of Lords 1947 and served in the Labour administration of Clement Attlee as Under-Secretary of State for Commonwealth Relations from March to July 1950.

Lord Holden died in July 1951, aged 52. He never married; on his death the barony became extinct. He was succeeded in his baronetcy by his kinsman Sir Isaac Holden, 5th Baronet.

He wrote a number of books; those listed in the British Library catalogue (all running into several editions) are
English Country Houses Open to the Public. (illustrated)
The Land of France (with Ralph Dutton)
Ceylon
Four Generations of Our Royal Family
French Châteaux Open to the Public (with Ralph Dutton)
Purgatory Revisited. A Victorian parody

References
"Lord Holden" [obituary], in The Times, Monday, Jul 09, 1951; pg. 8; Issue 52048; col E
"Lord Holden: A Vivid Personality" (Letters from "A friend", and Mr. R. J. Minney), The Times'', Thursday, Jul 12, 1951; pg. 8; Issue 52051; col G

1898 births
1951 deaths
Barons in the Peerage of the United Kingdom
Labour Party (UK) hereditary peers
Liberal Party (UK) parliamentary candidates
Ministers in the Attlee governments, 1945–1951